Placentia Bay is a body of water on the southeast coast of Newfoundland, Canada. It is formed by Burin Peninsula on the west and Avalon Peninsula on the east. Fishing grounds in the bay were used by native people long before the first European fishermen arrived in the 16th century. For a time, the French controlled the bay. They built their capital at Placentia on the east coast. The British gained Placentia during the Treaty of Utrecht in 1713. The town and nearby Castle Hill are national historic sites. English settlement followed in the bay and today the main communities are Burin, Marystown, and Placentia.

On 14 August 1941 US Naval Station Argentia located in Little Placentia Sound was the site of the Atlantic Conference for the Atlantic Charter, where Winston Churchill and Franklin D. Roosevelt met face to face for the first time since both took office and the start of World War II.  They followed up the summit later that year when Churchill joined FDR at the White House, following the Japanese attack on Pearl Harbor and the subsequent entry of the United States into World War II.

References 

Bays of Newfoundland and Labrador